The Voice of Hiphop & RnB is a Swedish radio station. A webcast of the station is available through The Voice Mediaplayer on the internet.

History 
The Voice, former Radio City and Mix Megapol, started in April 2004 in Stockholm on 105.9. The Voice is owned by ProSiebenSat.1 Media AG. After the merge with Bonnier Radio, SBS engaged in extensive research in the radio market in Stockholm. As they had (and have) a strong AC-station with Mix Megapol the research told them to seek a younger audience and they started The Voice of Hiphop & RnB. In 2006, relays were set up in Gothenburg on 107.8 and Malmö on 106.1.

Profile 
The Voice mixes hip-hop artists like Eminem, Petter and 50 Cent with  R&B from artists like Beyoncé, Janet Jackson, Usher, Akon and Justin Timberlake.

The brand of The Voice and the logo is represented in both Denmark and Norway through their sister stations.

References

Radio stations in Sweden
ProSiebenSat.1 Media
Radio stations established in 2004